Choczewo is a non-operational PKP railway station on the disused PKP rail line 230 in Choczewo (Pomeranian Voivodeship), Poland. It lies on the north side of the village of Choczewo itself.

Lines crossing the station

References 
Choczewo article at Polish Stations Database, URL accessed at 19 March 2006

Railway stations in Pomeranian Voivodeship
Disused railway stations in Pomeranian Voivodeship
Wejherowo County